Wattebledia siamensis is a species of freshwater snail with a gill and an operculum, an aquatic gastropod mollusk in the family Bithyniidae.

Distribution 
The native distribution of this species includes:
 Thailand

References

External links 

Bithyniidae
Gastropods described in 1902